Roland Gálos (born 26 May 1995) is a Hungarian boxer. He competed in the men's featherweight event at the 2020 Summer Olympics held in Tokyo, Japan.

In 2019, he competed in the men's 60 kg event at the 2019 European Games held in Minsk, Belarus.

References 

Living people
1995 births
Place of birth missing (living people)
Hungarian male boxers
European Games competitors for Hungary
Boxers at the 2019 European Games
Olympic boxers of Hungary
Boxers at the 2020 Summer Olympics
21st-century Hungarian people